Solomon is a 1997 television miniseries for RAI that retells the Bible's story of Solomon. Directed by Roger Young, it stars Ben Cross as Solomon, Vivica A. Fox as the Queen of Sheba, Anouk Aimée as Bathsheba and Max von Sydow as David.

Plot summary
The film begins with David still king of Israel. His sons Adonijah and Solomon are fierce rivals because both are prospective heirs to the throne. Adonijah challenges Solomon to a chariot race during a hunting expedition, which Solomon wins because Adonijah loses control of his chariot.

King David is aged and sickly, and announces that Solomon is the rightful heir to the throne over Israel. King David announces and ordinates Solomon as king in sight of the people.

Shortly after, King David dies and Solomon gives the order for Adonijah to be killed, who also was in an attempt to usurp the throne from Solomon. After this, God comes to Solomon in a dream and Solomon asks God to grant him wisdom that he may guide Israel well. God grants this desire to him.

With his newfound wisdom, Solomon proceeds to build the Temple of God in Jerusalem, according to the architectural plans that his father David had left behind. Soon after the Temple is successfully constructed, things begin to take a downward turn. Solomon begins to take more wives in direct violation of the Mosaic Law.

The Queen of Sheba makes a royal visit to Jerusalem. Solomon meets her and becomes infatuated with her. Solomon courts and impregnates her and aspires to make her his royal Queen, to the priests’ and council’s displeasure.

The story continues as Solomon’s ego and power-drunken attitude, much like their father's, cause things in his kingdom to spiral out of control.

Cast
 Ben Cross as Solomon
 Anouk Aimée as Bathsheba
 Vivica A. Fox as Queen of Sheba
 Max von Sydow as David
 Maria Grazia Cucinotta as Abishag
 Umberto Orsini as Nathan
 Stefania Rocca as Hannah
 Richard Dillane as Jeroboam
 Marta Zoffoli as Basemah
 Ivan Kaye as Adonijah
 G.W. Bailey as Azarel
 Dexter Fletcher as Rehoboam
 Roger Hammond as Zadok
 Michael Culkin as Hiram of Naphtali
 Stefan Gubser as Abiathar

Production
The film was shot in Morocco.

See also
 1997 in American television
 List of foreign films shot in Morocco

References

External links
 

1997 drama films
1990s adventure drama films
1997 television films
1997 films
American adventure drama films
American television films
Bible Collection
Films directed by Roger Young
Films based on the Bible
Films shot in Morocco
Films set in the 10th century BC
Films set in Jerusalem
1990s American films